Begaana is a 1963 Hindi is a romantic drama film. It was produced by Sadshiv Chitra and directed by Sadashiv Rao Kavi. The story was written by Mushtaq Jalili. The film stars Dharmendra, Supriya Chowdhury, Agha, Sailesh Kumar, Tarun Bose and Madhavi. The music is by Sapan Jagmohan with lyrics by Shailendra.

The film is a romantic triangle, filled with misunderstandings especially when the past lover (Sailesh Kumar) enters the life of a happily married couple. It's a drama that depicts the true bonding and love of a wife towards her husband.

Cast
 Supriya Choudhury
 Dharmendra
 Agha
 Sailesh Kumar
 Madhavi
 Manorama
 Tarun Bose
 Babloo

Soundtrack

Song list

References

External links 
 

1963 films
1960s Hindi-language films
Films scored by Sapan-Jagmohan